Sri. Moosa Kunhi Nayarmoole is a retired Judicial Member of the Karnataka Administrative Tribunal (KAT) in Karnataka, India.

Early life
Moosa Kunhi Nayarmoole was born in a Muslim Mappila family and was the youngest of the nine children of Haji Mohidin Kutty NayarMoole (an agriculturalist) and Fathima Hajumma. He was born on 11 March 1952 in Manilla Village of Bantwal Taluk, Dakshina Kannada District, Karnataka. He had his primary education at Higher Primary School, Paklakunja, and High School education at Government High School, Paivalike. He completed his B.Sc degree at Vivekanada College, Puttur securing the 10th rank in Mysore University. He did his law degree in Udupi Law College, Udupi and secured the sixth rank while studying law.

Career
He enrolled as an advocate on 29 January 1974 and started practice in Mangalore. He joined the Karnataka State Judiciary as Munsiff and Judicial Magistrate First Class, in 1983. As Munsiff and JMFC (Judicial Magistrate First Class) he served at Kumta, Hunsur, Chickmagalur, Moodigere and Belur. He was promoted to the position of Civil Judge in 1992 and worked as Additional Civil Judge at Dharwad, as Deputy Secretary to Government in Department of Law and Parliamentary Affairs, Government of Karnataka, and Civil Judge and Chief Judicial Magistrate at Hassan. He was promoted as District Judge in 2000. As District Judge he worked as City Civil and Sessions Judge, as Presiding Officer at Karnataka Wakf Tribunal, as Additional Director Karnataka Judicial Academy, as Secretary to Honorable Chief justice at the High Court of Karnataka, as Additional Secretary to Government of Karnataka in Department of Law Justice and Human Rights and Additional Registrar of Enquiries at Karnataka Lokayukta. In 2009, he was appointed as Registrar Lokayukta and held the said post until 3 October 2011. He was elevated to Judicial Member, Karnataka Administrative Tribunal on 3 October 2011. He is the First Judicial Officer from the District Judiciary in Karnataka to get elevation as Judicial Member, Karnataka Administrative Tribunal.

The Karnataka State government appointed senior judicial member Justice  Moosa Kunhi Nayarmoole as acting chairman of KAT on 26 October 2015 for a brief period.

References

http://www.newindianexpress.com/cities/bengaluru/Tenure-of-KAT-Acting-Chief-Ends/2015/10/27/article3099304.ece

Living people
1952 births